Kim Lynge Pedersen (born 3 April 1965) is a Danish weightlifter. He competed in the men's heavyweight I event at the 1992 Summer Olympics.

References

External links
 

1965 births
Living people
Danish male weightlifters
Olympic weightlifters of Denmark
Weightlifters at the 1992 Summer Olympics
People from Hirtshals
Sportspeople from the North Jutland Region